Sandrine Derrien is a female former international table tennis player from France.

Table tennis career
She won a bronze medal for France at the 1991 World Table Tennis Championships in the Corbillon Cup (women's team event) with Emmanuelle Coubat, Xiaoming Drechou and Agnès Le Lannic.

She also won a women's doubles and mixed doubles National title.

See also
 List of World Table Tennis Championships medalists

References

French female table tennis players
World Table Tennis Championships medalists
20th-century French women